Ramon de Moraes Motta (born May 6, 1988, in Cachoeiro do Itapemirim), is a Brazilian professional footballer who plays as a left back for Vasco da Gama.

Biography
He is called the 'Guerreiro' (warrior) in Brazil because of his loyal and aggressive gameplay.

Honors 
Vasco da Gama
Campeonato Brasileiro Série B: 2009
Copa do Brasil: 2011

Corinthians
Campeonato Brasileiro Série A: 2011
Copa Libertadores: 2012

Statistics

References

External links
 
 Guardian Stats Centre
 internacional.com.br
 ogol.com.br
 Ramon Motta at Soccerway

1988 births
Living people
Brazilian footballers
Brazilian expatriate footballers
Sport Club Internacional players
CR Vasco da Gama players
Sport Club Corinthians Paulista players
CR Flamengo footballers
Beşiktaş J.K. footballers
Antalyaspor footballers
Campeonato Brasileiro Série A players
Süper Lig players
Expatriate footballers in Turkey
Association football defenders